Pustulatirus is a genus of sea snails, marine gastropod mollusks in the subfamoly Peristerninae of the family Fasciolariidae, the spindle snails, the tulip snails and their allies.

Species
Species within the genus Pustulatirus include:
 Pustulatirus attenuatus (Reeve, 1847)
 Pustulatirus biocellatus Lyons & Snyder, 2013
 Pustulatirus eppi (Melvill, 1891)
 Pustulatirus hemphilli (Hertlein & Strong, 1951)
 Pustulatirus mediamericanus (Hertlein & Strong, 1951)
 Pustulatirus ogum (Petuch, 1979)
 Pustulatirus praestantior (Melvill, 1892)
 Pustulatirus sanguineus (Wood, 1828)
 Pustulatirus utilaensis Lyons & Snyder, 2013
 Pustulatirus virginensis (Abbott, 1958)
 Pustulatirus watermanorum Lyons & Snyder, 2013
Species brought into synonymy
 Pustulatirus annulatus (Röding, 1798): synonym of Pustulatirus virginensis (Abbott, 1958)

References

External links
 Vermeij, G. J. & Snyder, M. A. (2006). Shell characters and taxonomy of Latirus and related fasciolariid groups. Journal of Molluscan Studies. 72(4): 413-424
 Lyons, W. G.; Snyder, M. A. (2013). The Genus Pustulatirus Vermeij and Snyder, 2006 (Gastropoda: Fasciolariidae: Peristerniinae) in the Western Atlantic, with Descriptions of Three New Species. Zootaxa. 3636(1): 35

Fasciolariidae